Kenneth W. Nicholls, Irish academic and historian, is a widely respected Irish historian. 

Nicholls came to national and international prominence as the author of Gaelic and Gaelicised Ireland in the Middle Ages, first published in 1972, and reprinted in 2003. He is particularly regarded among his peers for his deep knowledge of late medieval and early modern historical sources in Irish, Latin, French and English languages. His areas of professional interests include:

 Late medieval and early modern Ireland, including topics such as genealogy, population studies, place-names, marriage, law, institutions
 Scottish history, particularly legal and institutional
 extinction of animals within historical times
 agrarian history

Ken Nicholls was a member of staff of the history department in University College Cork until his retirement in 2004. He also worked at the Dublin Institute for Advanced Studies for a period during the 1960s. His work is honoured in David Edwards (ed.) Regions and rulers in Ireland, 1100-1650: essays for Kenneth Nicholls (Dublin, 2004), which is a collection of essays by several of the leading Irish historians of today.

Select bibliography

Articles
 Tuath Bailenangeadh (Twoghballyneges etc.) in "Dinnseanchas", 2/3, 1967, p. 89.
 Tobar Finnmhuighe - Slan Padraig, Dinnseanchas, 2/4, 1967, p. 97-98.
 Some placenames from The Red Book of the Earls of Kildare, Dinnseanchas, 3/2, (1968), p. 25-37.
 The descendants of Oliver FitzGerald of Belagh, in The Irish Genealogist, 4/1 (1968), p. 2-9.
 The Lisgoole agreement of 1580, in  Clougher Record 7/1 (1969), p. 27-33.
 Some documents on Irish law and custom in the sixteenth century, in Analaecta Hibernica, #26, (1970), pp. 27–33.
 The Kavanaghs, 1400-1700 (I), in The Irish Genealogist, 5/4, (Nov 1977), pp. 435–47.
 The Kavanaghs, 1400-1700 (II), in The Irish Genealogist, 5/5, (Nov 1978), pp. 573–80.
 The Kavanaghs, 1400-1700 (III), in The Irish Genealogist, 5/6, (Nov 1979), pp. 730–334.
 The Kavanaghs, 1400-1700 (VI), in The Irish Genealogist, 6/2, (Nov 1981), pp. 189–203.
 Kinelmeaky and the Munster Plantation, in O'Mahony Journal, 10 (1980), p. 10-14.
 Notes on the genealogy of Clann Eoin Mhoir, in  West Highland Notes and Queries, 1991, p. 11-24.
 Richard Tyrell, Soldier Extraordinary, in The Battle of Kinsale, ed. Hiram Morgan, pp. 160–78, Dublin, 2004.

Books
 Gaelic and Gaelicised Ireland in the Middle Ages, Gill History of Ireland 4, Dublin, 1972; revised and reprinted by Lilliput Press, Dublin, 2003.
 The O'Doyne (Ó Duinn) Manuscript, Irish Historical Manuscripts Commission, Dublin, 1985.

External links
 Dialogue of Silvynne and Peregrynne, Hiram Morgan, Kenneth Nicholls (eds), Corpus of Electronic Texts.
 Kenneth Nicholls, Retired Staff, UCC

References 

20th-century Irish historians
21st-century Irish historians
Irish writers
Academics of University College Cork

Living people

Year of birth missing (living people)
Academics of the Dublin Institute for Advanced Studies